Susan M. Cappetta (August 20, 1948 – April 13, 2007) was an American pop musician. She was the writer of the top 40 hit "Dave Hull The Hullabalooer" in 1965, a song about Los Angeles radio personality Dave Hull. She was a member of the group, The Scuzzies and later worked in The Harrison & Tyler Show act. She had done work with Jimmy Ellis.

Background
Suzie Cappetta and her younger brothers, Michael and Robert, got their start in the music industry while growing up in Redondo Beach, California in the 1960s.
At the age of 15, Suzie wrote a song about a local Los Angeles, California disc jockey "Dave Hull The Hullabalooer" which became a regional hit when she, her two brothers, and two cousins recorded the song in the winter of 1964. The recording was chosen by Casey Kasem as a KRLA "DJ Pick To Hit". Casey's prediction was correct when the song made the Top 40 charts in Los Angeles on March 7, 1965.

The Quintet was dubbed "The Scuzzies" by Dave Hull himself when he first aired the song on his radio show. Suzie also wrote and recorded, with the help of her brothers, several jingles for Los Angeles radio station KRLA. Among those was a jingle the Scuzzies recorded promoting Baskin-Robbins' new "Scuzzy" ice cream flavor combination.

As the Scuzzies, they made television appearances on "9th Street West" with Sam Riddle in Hollywood, Los Angeles, California and "TV-8 Dancetime" with Bob Hower in San Diego, California. They were featured in Bob Eubanks' Cinnamon Cinder and Casey Kasem's Clubs. One of the highlights for the Scuzzies in 1965 was when they became the opening act for "Sonny & Cher" at the Grand Opening of "Jamaica West Jr." in Torrance, California.

Overseas work
1969 saw brother Michael fulfilling his obligation in the US Navy, while Suzie toured with the USO shows in 1970, singing and playing bass guitar in "The Harrison & Tyler Show", the first all-female band in USO history. The show, promoted by Johnny Grant, performed for U.S. troops in Viet Nam and Thailand.

The Cappetta Company etc
By 1972, Suzie and Michael got together again to become a musical duo, entertaining in nightclubs in the South Bay, Los Angeles California area. Six months later, younger brother Robert joined Suzie and Michael as their drummer, to form a family trio.

In 1973, Suzie and her two brothers headlined as "The Cappetta Company".  The popular trio was booked in the Reuben's Restaurant chain five nights a week throughout the 1970s.

As "The Cappetta Company", the trio performed "LIVE" music sets on KGBS-FM during the Glen Falkenstein Show in the mid-1970s, broadcasting from the Star Theater at Universal Studios in Hollywood, showcased in Las Vegas, Nevada in the Casinos of the Mint and Hacienda Hotels, and continued to headline in major hotels, restaurants, and night clubs throughout the 1980s and into the early 1990s.  Their versatility in musical styles can be heard in their "live" performances and in their studio recordings which have received airplay on many radio stations from the Pacific Coast, to the Atlantic Coast of America, and even across the Atlantic to the UK.
Other groups
In later years she was a member of group Cold Fire that consisted of herself on vocals and acoustic guitar, Michael Cappetta on vocals and bass guitar, Martin Pomeroy on vocals guitar and keyboards, Richard Martinez on drums and Ken Roberts on guitar. Drummer Martinez would later become the General Manager for the Music is Hope Foundation. She would work with Roberts again with Stevie & the Saints, and with Jimmy Ellis. As a member of hard rock Christian group, Stevie & the Saints, she sang lead and backup vocals for the band fronted by guitarist Steve Olson.

Session work
In 1996 she contributed background vocals to Jimmy "Preacher" Ellis's album Red, Hot & Blues. She would do the same work again with this artist from Arkansas on his 2008 album, That's Why We All Have the Blues.

Illness and death
In 1993, Cappetta had colon cancer. Five years later, she began to have heart problems, ultimately leading to congestive heart failure, which caused her health to decline more rapidly after the year 2000.

She died on April 13, 2007, at the age of 58.

Discography

Credits

References

1948 births
2007 deaths
American women pop singers
Musicians from Redondo Beach, California
Place of birth missing
Place of death missing
American pop guitarists
20th-century American women
21st-century American women